Xirochori (before 1926: Γιόρδινον - Giordinon) is a community and a village in the municipal unit of Agios Athanasios in the Thessaloniki regional unit, Greece. The community is 25 km north-northwest of downtown Thessaloniki.

The community consists of two villages: Xirochori and Baleika. According to the 2011 census, it has a total population of 602, with the village of Xirochori having 567 of those and Baleika 35.

References

Populated places in Thessaloniki (regional unit)